Edinburgh Central was a burgh constituency of the House of Commons of the Parliament of the United Kingdom (at Westminster) from 1885 to 2005. It elected one Member of Parliament (MP) by the first past the post system of election.

In 1999, a Scottish Parliament constituency was created with the same name and boundaries, and continues in use. See Edinburgh Central (Scottish Parliament constituency).

From 1925 until 1999, the Member of Parliament for the Westminster constituency was an ex officio member of the Board of Trustees of the National Library of Scotland. Since 1999, that role has been taken by the Member of the Scottish Parliament (MSP) for the Scottish Parliament constituency.

Boundaries
1885–1918: The Municipal Wards of St. Giles, George Square, and St. Leonard, except so much as is comprised in the Edinburgh East Division (being the part to the north of a line drawn along the centres of East and West Richmond Streets).

1918–1950: The George Square, St. Giles' and St. Leonard's Municipal Wards of Edinburgh.

1950–1955: The George Square, Holyrood, and St Giles wards of the county of the city of Edinburgh.

1955–1974: The George Square, Holyrood, and St Giles wards of the county of the city of Edinburgh; and part of Gorgie-Dalry ward.

1974–1983: The George Square, Gorgie-Dalry, Holyrood, and St Giles wards of the county of the city of Edinburgh; and part of Merchiston ward.

1983–1997: The City of Edinburgh District electoral divisions of Dalry/Shandon, Haymarket/Tollcross, Murrayfield/Dean, New Town/Stockbridge, and St Giles/Holyrood.

1997–2005: The City of Edinburgh District electoral divisions of Dalry/Shandon, Fountainbridge/Tollcross, Moat/Stenhouse, Murrayfield/Dean, and St Giles/Holyrood.

The 1997–2005 boundaries covered a central portion of the City of Edinburgh council area, including Edinburgh Old Town, the West End, Holyrood and Murrayfield. The constituency was one of six covering the city council area.

At the 2005 general election, the constituency area was divided between Edinburgh East, Edinburgh North and Leith, Edinburgh South West and Edinburgh West.

Members of Parliament

Elections

Elections in the 1880s

Elections in the 1890s

Note:
The John Wilson who stood as a candidate in 1892 is not the same John Wilson that stood in 1885 and 1886

Elections in the 1900s

Elections in the 1910s

General Election 1914–15:

Another General Election was required to take place before the end of 1915. The political parties had been making preparations for an election to take place and by the July 1914, the following candidates had been selected; 
Liberal: Charles Price
Unionist: 
Labour: William Graham

Elections in the 1920s

Elections in the 1930s

General Election 1939–40:

Another General Election was required to take place before the end of 1940. The political parties had been making preparations for an election to take place from 1939 and by the end of this year, the following candidates had been selected; 
Conservative: James Guy
Labour: Andrew Gilzean

Elections in the 1940s

Elections in the 1950s

Elections in the 1960s

Elections in the 1970s

Elections in the 1980s
Although the Edinburgh Central seat had been won by the Labour Party in 1979, had that election been fought on the new boundaries it was estimated that the Conservatives would have won the seat by a majority of 1,971.

Elections in the 1990s

Elections in the 2000s

See also 
 Politics of Edinburgh

Notes and references

Central
Historic parliamentary constituencies in Scotland (Westminster)
Constituencies of the Parliament of the United Kingdom established in 1885
Constituencies of the Parliament of the United Kingdom disestablished in 2005